The Tory family is a prominent family of lawyers and politicians in Canada, some members of which are associated with the Toronto law firm Torys. The family traces its roots back to Nova Scotia and James Tory (1753–1834), who migrated there from Aberdeenshire, Scotland. The family's greatest influence is in Ontario, beginning with John Alexander Tory Sr.

Notable family members
 Robert Kirk Tory - Methodist minister in Nova Scotia (1838–1892)
 Henry Marshall Tory - founding president of the University of Alberta (1864–1947)
 James Cranswick Tory - Lieutenant Governor of Nova Scotia (1925–1930) and Liberal Party of Nova Scotia Member of the House Assembly for Guysborough County (1911–1923)
 John Alexander Tory Sr. - head of Ontario operations for Sun Life Assurance Company (1869–1950) 
 John Stewart Donald Tory - founder of the firm Torys (1903–1965)
 James Marshall Tory - member of the law firm Torys (1930–2013)
 John Alexander Tory Jr. - Toronto lawyer and media executive with Thomson Reuters and Rogers Communications (1930–2011)
 John Howard Tory - lawyer, media executive (Rogers Communications), broadcaster with CFRB-AM, Commissioner of the Canadian Football League, Mayor of Toronto (since 2014), former leader of the Progressive Conservative Party of Ontario (2004–2009) and MPP for Dufferin—Peel—Wellington—Grey (2005–2007) (b. 1954)
 James Marshall (J.M.) Tory - Toronto lawyer (1904–1994)
 Edward Alexander Tory (1938–1994)

References